The Central District of Bandar-e Gaz County is a district (bakhsh) in Bandar-e Gaz County, Golestan Province, Iran. At the 2006 census, its population was 31,046, in 7,939 families.  The District has one city: Bandar-e Gaz.  The District has two rural districts (dehestan): Anzan-e Gharbi Rural District and Anzan-e Sharqi Rural District.

References 

Districts of Golestan Province
Bandar-e Gaz County